Elisabeth Bagréeff-Speransky (also Elizaveta Mikhailovna Speranskaya; ; 5 September 1799 O.S./16 September 1799 (N.S.) – 4 April 1857) was a Russian noblewoman and writer. She was the only child of the statesman Mikhail Speransky and his English wife, Elizabeth Stephens. As her mother died when she was two months old, Speranskaya was raised by her grandmother Eliza (née Planta) Stephens and educated by her father. Her studies included history, composition, reading, literature, and languages – English, French, German, Italian, Latin, and Russian. In order to improve her delicate health, she spent her childhood in various places, including Saint Petersburg, Kyiv, and Novgorod Oblast, but she also visited her father who was exiled from the capital from 1812 to 1821. Passing the state examination to be a home teacher in 1819, she began teaching children.

In 1822, Speranskaya married Prince , the governor of the Chernigov Governorate. The couple had three children, although the youngest died when two years old. They were not well-suited, as she was a charming, salon hostess and he was somber and taciturn. Frolov-Bagreev's failure to manage his business and their personal affairs caused a split between the couple in 1838 which remained unreconciled. Speranskaya began to travel as a means of overcoming her problems, visiting European cities, including the Dutch resort of Scheveningen, spa villages in Bavaria, Vienna and Salzburg in Austria, Lucerne in Switzerland, various places in the north of Italy. Speranskaya had begun writing in 1828, publishing stories and plays for her children and she wrote poetry on her travels.

Taking over the management of Velyka Burimka in 1842, Sparanskaya built schools, orphanages, a brewery and distillery, brick works, carpentry shops, factories, and mills, and reorganized the hospital. She brought in master craftsmen to train the villagers to work in these enterprises. After four years of tiring work, the death of her surviving son, and the pending marriage of her daughter, Sparanskaya traveled to Brussels, then to Basel and Geneva in Switzerland, and through Florence, Venice, and Trieste before making a pilgrimage to Egypt and the Holy Land. To prevent her new son-in-law, Prince , taking over the administration of her estate, Speranskaya returned to Ukraine in 1847 and managed Velyka Burimka for the next three years until her health failed. Traveling to Vienna to seek medical treatment, she made an arrangement for her daughter and son-in-law to manage the estate and share the profits with her. Instead, they tried to sell it and managed to reduce what they owed her, knowing she was too ill to travel and contest their actions.

As a distraction from her legal and physical problems, Speranskaya revived her role as hostess to a well-known salon and began to write, publishing under the surname Bagréeff-Speransky (or Bagréeff-Speranski). Between 1852 and 1857 she wrote thirty-two books, mostly in French and German. These included religious texts, travel sketches, stories of life in the Russian Empire, novels, plays, and children's books. Her writing was popular with European audiences and gained favorable reviews from scholars like Jakob Philipp Fallmerayer and Prosper Mérimée. Elisabeth Bagréeff-Speransky died on 4 April 1857, in Vienna. She and her father were described with unfavorable caricatures in Count Leo Tolstoy's classic novel War and Peace, but modern scholarship has reviewed letters exchanged by the father and daughter which disprove Tolstoy's depiction. She was included in numerous biographical lexicons in the nineteenth and early twentieth centuries, while in recent years interest in her life and work has been renewed.

Early life and education

Elizaveta Mikhailovna Speranskaya was born on 16 September 1799 (N.S.) in Saint Petersburg, Russian Empire, to Elizabeth Jane (née Stephens) and Mikhail Speransky. Stephens was the daughter of the English woman, Eliza (née Planta) Stephens, and had moved with her mother to Russia around 1789, after the death of her father Rev. Henry Stephens. Eliza served as a governess to Countess Catherine Shuvalova, who allowed the children Elizabeth, Marianne, and Francis to live with their mother. The couple married at the end of 1798, but Stephens died from tuberculosis in November 1799, two months after their daughter's birth.

Speransky was distraught over his wife's death and buried himself in his work. He requested his mother-in-law's help in 1801, when he was promoted to serve as an "Assistant Minister of Justice, as Governor of Finland, as Privy Councillor, and as Secretary of State" to Alexander, the new Tsar of Russia. Eliza was in Vienna when her daughter died. Her charge, had married Franz Joseph, Prince of Dietrichstein in 1797, and relocated there. In 1801, Eliza was able to return to Saint Petersburg and moved into Speransky's house to care for Speranskaya. The following year when Speranskaya's aunt Marianne married Konstantin Zlobin, Eliza's family with Speranskaya all moved into the home of Marianne's father-in-law, .

Within six months the couple were having difficulties and Vasily, who was fond of his daughter-in-law suggested a temporary separation, sending Marianne and her family to Baldone (now in Latvia) to enjoy the sulfur water spa there. By the time they returned in the autumn, Konstantin had abandoned the family. For more than a year, Vasily tried in vain to negotiate a reconciliation, although the couple did not divorce until 1810. The Stephens family moved back in with Speransky briefly, but because of Speranskaya's delicate health, they left Saint Petersburg for Kyiv (now in Ukraine), where they remained until 1809. That year Speransky bought a house in Saint Petersburg near the Tauride Garden and the family returned as Speranskaya's health had improved. Marianne died in 1811, leaving her estate Velikopolye in the Novgorod Oblast to her niece Speranskaya. In March 1812, after her father fell out of favor with the tsar, primarily because of his inability to cooperate or ingratiate himself with Russian nobility, he was sent into exile. He left a note for Speranskaya that she and her grandmother were to join him in Nizhny Novgorod, as soon as it could be arranged. Once they were reunited, Speransky developed an educational program for his daughter, teaching her history, composition, reading, literature, and various languages. She learned German by reading the Bible and Friedrich Schiller's work on Joan of Arc and also studied the works of William Shakespeare. She gained fluency in English, French, German, and Russian and learned to read Latin and write in Italian.

In late summer 1812, Speransky was separated from his daughter and sent to the Siberian border near Perm. Despite their separation, he continued to supervise Speranskaya's education. She and her grandmother were sent back to Saint Petersburg at the end of 1813, although they visited him from time to time at Perm and later when he was moved to Speranskaya's estate Velikopolye near Novgorod. Historian Marc Raeff stated that Eliza and Speranskaya brought money for him to live on in exile, and both Raeff and William Blackwood noted that when Speransky had trouble getting missives delivered to Tsar Alexander describing his penury, Speranskaya was able to deliver a letter to the emperor, who allotted her father an annual stipend. At the beginning of 1814, Speransky requested that his daughter, whom he called Lisa or Lise, should move back to Velikopolye, where he joined her later in the year. That year, Speransky returned to government service in various provincial posts. In 1815, Speransky sent Eliza to live in Kyiv, where she died at the end of the year. Speranskaya returned to Saint Petersburg, where she resided with a family friend, Maria (née Amburger) Weikard, the wife of the Shuvalova family's physician.

Marriage and family life

Speranskaya passed the state examination to be a home teacher in 1819 and began teaching children. In 1821, Speransky returned to Saint Petersburg. Blackwood states that it was because of an inappropriate love interest with his daughter and a military officer, who historian  identifies as Georg Weikard. The relationship was terminated but Speranskaya became despondent and attempted suicide. Speransky began to draft plans to reorganize the provincial governments for more efficiency and took charge of finding Speranskaya a suitable husband, hosting numerous social events to allow her the opportunity to mix with society. That year, she was appointed as a lady-in-waiting to Elizabeth Alexeievna, Empress of Russia.

In August 1822, Speranskaya married Prince , the governor of the Chernigov Governorate. Frolov-Bagreev was the nephew of Kochubey's husband, the brother of his mother, Agrafena Pavlovna Kochubey. Initially, they lived in Chernihiv, but in May 1824 the couple moved to Saint Petersburg when Frolov-Bagreev took a post in the Ministry of Finance of the Russian Empire. The couple were not well-suited, as Speranskaya's circle were intellectuals and artists while Frolov-Bagreev was a dull simpleton. He was described by Speranskaya's biographer, as "" (selfish and distrustful), although he exhibited polite manners. He was often silent, behaving with an air of superiority and completely ignoring his wife. Speranskaya was a charismatic and charming hostess whose salon was attended by Saint Petersburg's celebrated artists, scientists, and statesmen. Among her frequent guests were Alexander and Karl Bryullov, Nikolay Karamzin, Adam Mickiewicz, Alexander Pushkin, Ivan Turgenev, and Pyotr Vyazemsky. Pushkin remained a close friend until his death.

At the beginning of 1824, the couple had a son, whom they named Mikhail, and two years later, a daughter, Maria. During this time, Frolov-Bagreev had mismanaged funds at the bank and lost a large sum of money, which Speranskaya rectified by selling her jewels. In 1825, Tsar Alexander died and was succeeded after the Decembrist revolt by his brother, Nicholas. Speranskaya brought an English governess to help her with the children and in 1828 published her first book,  (Readings for Young Children) for them. She wrote other children's stories and short plays for them and began publishing stories anonymously in local newspapers. Her second son, Alexander, was born around 1830 but died when two-years old. In 1831, Speransky borrowed money and bought his daughter an estate, where she raised her children. The estate covered  and encompassed seven villages. Devastated by her son's death, Speranskaya left the Russian Empire for the first time in 1833 and traveled to the Dutch seaside resort of Scheveningen, where she wrote poetry in English and Russian.

Under the arrangement agreed upon by Speransky and his son-in-law, Frolov-Bagreev was to repay the amount which had been borrowed to purchase the estate, while also managing it. Although Speranskaya created model farms, wood distribution facilities, dispensaries, and schools to ensure the welfare of her family and community, her husband's mismanagement of the estate and failure to pay even the interest on the loans for three years found them facing foreclosure. With great difficulty, an agreement was reached by 1838 to ward off the loss of the estate, but the relationship did not survive and the couple thereafter lived separately. In early 1839, Tsar Nicholas made Speransky a count and granted him an income, but he died on 23 February (O.S.). Speranskaya asked if her son could bear the name Speransky, keep the title, and as was customary, receive her father's pension for six years, but her request was denied.

To prevent her estranged husband from seizing her father's estate, Speranskaya sent their son to a boarding school and in July traveled abroad with their daughter, on the pretext that she needed a spa cure. They went to Bavaria and stayed at Bad Kissingen and then Bad Gastein before wintering in Frankfurt. They returned to the Bavarian baths in the summer of 1840. She also took short trips to England to visit her family there and to Darmstadt in Germany. Speranskaya and her daughter then visited the Duchy of Salzburg and traveled by steamboat down the Danube to Vienna. In May 1841, they left the Austrian capital and traveled to Styria, continuing through the Illyrian Provinces to Lucerne in Switzerland and on to northern Italy. During her travels, she wrote poetry in English. They returned to Austria, staying first in Baden and then wintering in Vienna. In answer to a letter from her husband, she advised that they might return to Saint Petersburg in the summer of 1842.

Career

Estate manager (1842–1850)
After receiving a letter from the foreman at the Velyka Burimka estate, Speranskaya decided to go there instead, as in her absence Frolov-Bagreev had once again mismanaged it and the serfs were struggling. Traveling through Galicia, she and her daughter made their way through Podolia to Volhynia and Kyiv before arriving in Poltava near her estate. She found miserable conditions – starvation due to famine and bad harvests, as well as rampant disease, such as dysentery, scurvy and whooping cough. She immediately took measures to rectify the situation bringing in wheat, meat, and vegetables and setting up child care centers and orphanages to serve children whose parents were unable to provide for them. She bought livestock to distribute to those who had lost their animals and reorganized the village hospital, which had fallen into ruin.

Speranskaya finally returned to Saint Petersburg in August 1842 and was greeted by her son, who had become an officer in the Russian Imperial Guard. She rented a house near her son's garrison and informed her husband that since he did not want the responsibility, she was taking control of the estate at Velyka Burimka. The expense of living in Saint Petersburg and the need to provide for her estate, forced Speranskaya to sell one of her father's estates near Penza and return to the south in February 1843. By hiring master craftsmen to train the local peasants as apprentices, she was able to restore the brewery and the stables, and to establish not only a brickyard, carpentry shop, distillery, forge, saltpetre factory, and a sawmill, but also windmills, watermills, and a spinning mill. She created elementary schools for children and trade workshops for teenagers who were not yet ready to work in the fields or enter professions. In February 1844 her son Mikhail was transferred to a garrison near her Ukraine estate and her daughter, whom she had educated herself, was sent to live with her father to complete her education. Mikhail died a few months later, when during an expedition in the Caucasus he tried to stop two drunken soldiers from fighting and was slashed with a sword.

Speranskaya's daughter returned to live with her and became engaged to Prince  later in 1844. Her husband died from a stroke without the couple reconciling the following year. For a second time, she chose to travel to distract herself from distress over the loss of her son. She left Velyka Burimka in January 1846 to take a cure for gout at Baden bei Wien. After four months in Vienna, Speranskaya spent two months in Paris and then traveled on to Brussels, Basel, Geneva, Florence and Venice, before arriving in Trieste where her daughter was married that year on 19 November. After the wedding, Speranskaya resumed traveling, going to Egypt and Palestine. During her absence, she hired a series of administrators to take care of the estate. Accusing one of them of mismanagement, her new son-in-law, Cantacuzène, attempted to take over as steward. To prevent him doing do, she returned to Ukraine in June 1847 and resumed management. For the next two years, Speranskaya worked to restore the profitability of Velyka Burimka but her efforts impacted her health. In July 1850, she reached an agreement with her daughter whereby the Cantacuzènes could take over the estate on condition they shared the profits, while she proceeded to Vienna to seek medical treatment.

Writer (1850–1857)

Within six months of arriving in Vienna, Speranskaya's daughter wrote to her wanting to reduce the payments due and Cantacuzène asked the emperor to allow Speranskaya to sell her estate so that she could expatriate. Although she had no intention of selling, Speranskaya was too ill to return home to fight their claims and agreed to have her income reduced. She wrote to the tsar explaining her situation and begged him to allow her to remain in Vienna. He agreed, provided the estate was not sold. Despite the tsar's intervention, she often had trouble renewing her residency permit with the Ministry of Justice in Vienna until 1854, when Alexander Gorchakov replaced the previous minister. During this time, as a distraction from her legal and physical problems, Speranskaya began to write, using a French spelling of her married surname Bagréeff-Speransky (or Bagréeff-Speranski), sometimes rendered in English as Speransky-Bagréeff. She also revived her role as hostess to a well-known salon, often attended by notables like Franz Grillparzer and Betty Paoli. She traveled to Paris and various places in Germany in 1856, visiting friends like Alfred de Falloux, Sophie Swetchine and Maria Soldan. When she returned, she offered her father's papers to the new tsar, Alexander II, who not only accepted the gift, but granted her a pension.

Before her death, Bagréeff-Speransky published thirty-two works in French, German, and Russian covering a variety of genres. She wrote religious texts, travel sketches, stories of life in the Russian Empire, as well as novels, plays, and children's books. She also acted as an advisor to Korff who was preparing a biography of her father's life.
 
 told of her pilgrimage to Palestine,  chronicled her experiences in and around Kyiv and contained a collection of short stories, and  described the vicinity of the capital city of the Tsardom of Russia.  related her experiences in Siberia and spoke of the customs of the Evenk people and their encounters and clashes with Christians and Cossacks who traveled to their traditional homelands, uprooting their nomadic lives. Her novel Irene focused on the benefits of education and was compared by Blackwood to the works by Maria Edgeworth. The novella "Pokritka" ("The Evicted One"), published shortly before her death, was a tragedy about an old woman being removed from her estate. Her works were reviewed favorably by scholars like Jakob Philipp Fallmerayer and Prosper Mérimée. Mérimée said that he found her works so interesting that he wanted to visit Russia.

Death and legacy
Bagréeff-Speransky died in Vienna on 4 April 1857 from an ear infection, a severe headache, or tuberculosis, and was buried in St. Marx Cemetery. Her daughter Maria inherited the Velyka Burimka estate and lived there until her death in 1887. Hers was an unhappy marriage according to family members and produced only one son, who was born in 1847. Celebrations in honor of the centennial of Speransky's birth were held in Saint Petersburg in 1872, and Maria, over her husband's objection, successfully asked Tsar Alexander II to have Speransky's title granted to her son. Mikhail married Elizabeth Sicard and their oldest son Mikhail became the husband of Julia Dent Grant, granddaughter of United States President Ulysses S. Grant in 1899. The estate was burned and looted by the Bolsheviks during the Ukrainian–Soviet War in 1918. When the area became Soviet Ukraine in 1919, the family fled, first to Kyiv and then abroad to Constantinople, Malta, and eventually Paris.

At the time of her death, Bagréeff-Speransky was remembered for the memoirs she had published about Russia. Both she and her father were discussed in Count Leo Tolstoy's classic novel War and Peace, (Volume II, Part III). According to scholars Raeff and Sara Dickinson, Tolstoy made an unfavorable caricature of Speransky and depicted Bagréeff-Speransky as a lonely child, who lacked her father's attention. Raeff maintained Tolstoy's depiction of Speransky was incorrect, while Dickinson emphasized that letters exchanged between father and daughter showed that even during their periods of separation, they had a close and affectionate relationship.

Dickinson noted that Bagréeff-Speransky was not included in the 1994 Dictionary of Russian Women Writers edited by Marina Ledkovsky, Charlotte Rosenthal, and Mary Zirin, possibly because she lived abroad, wrote anonymously, published infrequently, and rarely produced work in Russian. However, Bagréeff-Speransky is included in numerous earlier biographical dictionaries, such as the Biographical Encyclopedia of the Austrian Empire (1858), Brockhaus and Efron Encyclopedic Dictionary (1902), Nordisk familjebok (1904), and the Russian Biographical Dictionary (1901). Still earlier, Duret published  (A Russian Portrait, 1867) which gave a biographical account of her life and various writings, both published and unpublished. Duret edited and posthumously published her reflections and diary, written between 1845 and her death, under the title "" ("A Woman's Book") for the first time in 1867. Daniil Mordovtsev included a chapter on her in his book  (Russian Women of Modern Times, 1874), which covered correspondence from Bagréeff-Speransky and her father. According to Dickinson, modern scholarship is revisiting her life and works.

Selected works

Notes

References

Citations

Bibliography

 

 (As both volumes number from 1, pages are denoted as 1: p# for volume 1 and 2: p# for volume 2.)

1799 births
1857 deaths
Writers from Saint Petersburg
Philanthropists from the Russian Empire
Salon holders from the Russian Empire
19th-century women writers from the Russian Empire
19th-century women philanthropists
Russian emigrants to Austria
Planta family
People from the Russian Empire of Swiss descent